Viktor Vasilyevich Muyzhel (July 30, 1880 - February 3, 1924) was a writer and painter.

Biography
Muyzhel was born in the village of Uza,  Pskov Governorate (present-day Porkhovsky District, Pskov Oblast). His father was a minor official. Muyzhel's first published work appeared in 1903. The Russian countryside is the setting for most of his works of fiction, including his novel The Year (1911). He was influenced by Narodnik ideology and in many of his works depicted peasant unrest. Some of Muyzhel's works detail the stagnant bourgeois way of life in pre-revolutionary Russia.

After the Russian Revolution of 1917, Muyzhel wrote short stories, novellas, and the play Spring Wind (1923). Muyzhel's works were published in popular journals; his early works were published in Russkoye Bogatstvo, and his later works were published in Maxim Gorky's Znanie collections.

References

1880 births
1924 deaths
People from Pskov Oblast
People from Porkhovsky Uyezd
Novelists from the Russian Empire
Dramatists and playwrights from the Russian Empire
Short story writers from the Russian Empire
Soviet novelists
Soviet dramatists and playwrights
Soviet short story writers